Heterophleps is a genus of moths in the family Geometridae erected by Gottlieb August Wilhelm Herrich-Schäffer in 1854.

Species
 Heterophleps bicommata (Warren, 1893)
 Heterophleps confusa Wilerman, 1911
 Heterophleps euthygramma Wehrli, 1932
 Heterophleps fusca (Butler, 1878)
 Heterophleps inusitata Li, Jiang & Han, 2012
 Heterophleps morensata (Hulst, 1896)
 Heterophleps ocyptaria (Swinhoe, 1893)
 Heterophleps refusaria (Walker, 1861)
 Heterophleps triguttaria Herrich-Schäffer, [1854]

References

Trichopterygini